The following are notable people who were born in, raised in, or have lived for a significant period of time in the U.S. state of Nebraska.

Native Americans

Crazy Horse (1838–1877), great warrior of the Oglala Lakota Sioux pre-statehood
Chief Waukon Decorah (c. 1780–1868)
He Dog (c. 1840–1936)
Hononegah (c. 1814–1847) (Ho-Chunk)
Francis La Flesche (1857–1932), first Native American anthropologist, author (Omaha people)
Susan La Flesche Picotte (1865–1915), first Native American woman to earn a medical degree
Susette LaFlesche Tibbles (1854–1903), writer and translator
Little Hawk (1836–1900)
Red Bird (c. 1788–1828), Ho-Chunk leader
Red Cloud (1822–1909), chief of the Oglala Sioux
Chief Standing Bear (c. 1829–1908), civil rights leader and at the fore of the petition to stay on traditional homelands post-removal as documented in The Trial of Standing Bear; in this trial the state was led to recognize that Native Americans are human beings
John Trudell (1946–2015), civil rights activist, community activist, speaker, poet, performer, musician, actor; Santee
Raymond Yellow Thunder (1921–1972), ranch hand killed in a notable hate crime in 1972 in Gordon (Oglala Lakota)

Public office

Frank Aloysius Barrett (1892–1962), Congressman, Wyoming, 1943–1950; Governor of Wyoming, 1951–1953; Senator of Wyoming, 1953–1959
Herbert Brownell Jr. (1904–1996), United States Attorney General in President Eisenhower's cabinet, 1952–1957
William Jennings Bryan (1860–1925), United States Secretary of State; U.S. Representative; Democratic Party nominee for President in 1896, 1900, and 1908; prosecuting attorney in Scopes Trial
Hugh A. Butler (1878–1954), U.S. Senator
James Vincenzo Capone (1892–1952), federal Prohibition agent; oldest brother of gangster Al Capone; changed name to Richard James Hart
Ernie Chambers (born 1937 in Omaha), Nebraska State Senator; Nebraska State Legislature; civil rights activist
Dick Cheney (born 1941), former U.S. Secretary of Defense under George HW Bush, and 46th Vice President of the United States under George W Bush
George E. Cryer (1875–1961), 32nd Mayor of Los Angeles, 1921–1929
Glenn Cunningham (1912–2003), U.S. Representative and mayor of Omaha
Carl Curtis (1905–2000), U.S. Representative and U.S. Senator
Samuel Gordon Daily (1823–1866), U.S. Representative for three terms
Robert Vernon Denney (1916–1981), U.S. Representative and United States district court judge
Jane English (born 1940), Republican member of the Arkansas State Senate
J. James Exon (1921–2005), Governor of Nebraska and U.S. Senator
Gerald Ford (1913–2006), 38th President of the United States (born in Omaha, raised in Michigan)
Dwight Griswold (1893–1954), Governor of Nebraska and U.S. Senator
Chuck Hagel (born 1946), U.S. Senator and 24th U.S. Secretary of Defense
Robert Dinsmore Harrison (1897–1977), U.S. Representative
Edgar Howard (1858–1951), private secretary to William Jennings Bryan; Lieutenant Governor of Nebraska; U.S. Representative
Megan Hunt (born 1986), Nebraska state legislator and first openly LGBT person elected to state legislature
Bob Kerrey (born 1943), Governor of Nebraska and U.S. Senator
Julius Sterling Morton (1832–1902), United States Secretary of Agriculture; founder of Arbor Day
Kay A. Orr (born 1939), first Republican woman governor (Nebraska) in United States history (1987–1991)
Pete Peterson (born 1935), U.S. Representative for Florida, U.S. Ambassador to Vietnam
Peter George Peterson (1926–2018), U.S. Secretary of Commerce under Richard Nixon; Chair of the Federal Reserve Bank of New York; Chair of the Council on Foreign Relations
Donald Pike (1925–2008), Los Angeles County Superior Court Commissioner
Leo Ryan (1925–1978), U.S. Representative (Democrat–California; born in Lincoln)
Ted Sorensen (1928–2010), speechwriter and special counsel to President John F. Kennedy
Charles Thone (1924–2018), Governor of Nebraska and U.S. Representative
Kenneth S. Wherry (1892–1951), U.S. Senator

Military

Buffalo Bill Cody (1845–1917), iconic western figure; lived in Nebraska (born in Iowa Territory) while working as a scout for the 5th Cavalry; on July 17, 1876, at War Bonnet Creek, while dressed in his Wild West stage clothing, he killed and scalped Chief Yellow Hair (Cheyenne), claiming it a revenge for Custer; took up residence in Scout's Rest Ranch in 1886
Alfred Gruenther (1899–1983), youngest four-star general in United States history; Supreme Allied Commander Europe
Galen B. Jackman (born 1951), United States Army major general (retired); Nancy Reagan's escort throughout the death and state funeral of Ronald Reagan; first commanding general of the Joint Force Headquarters National Capital Region
Bob Kerrey (born 1943), United States Navy, LT(JG); commanded a Navy SEAL team in Vietnam; Medal of Honor recipient
Francis P. Matthews (1887–1952), 49th United States Secretary of the Navy during the administration of President Harry Truman
Butler B. Miltonberger (1897–1977), commanded the 134th Infantry Regiment, 35th Division during World War II
Jarvis Offutt (1894–1918), World War I aviator, namesake of Offutt Air Force Base
Forrest S. Petersen (1922–1990), Navy and NASA test pilot, head of Naval Air Systems Command
James G. Roudebush (born c. 1949), United States Air Force lieutenant general and doctor of medicine, current Surgeon General of the United States Air Force
Albert Coady Wedemeyer (1897–1989), military planner and strategist

Entertainment

Film and theater
A–M

Wesley Addy (1913–1996), actor, Network, The Verdict
Adele Astaire (1897–1981), dancer and entertainer
Fred Astaire (1899–1987), dancer and actor, The Band Wagon, Funny Face, The Towering Inferno, That's Entertainment!
Pamela Austin (born 1941), actress, Kissin' Cousins
Ray Baker (born 1948), actor, Silverado, Total Recall
Andrew Rannells (born 1978), actor, The Book of Mormon
John Beasley (born 1943), actor, Everwood
Michael Biehn (born 1956), actor, The Terminator, Tombstone
Moon Bloodgood (born 1975), actress, Terminator Salvation, Falling Skies
Ward Bond (1903–1960), actor, The Searchers, The Quiet Man, Rio Bravo
Marlon Brando (1924–2004), Academy Award-winning actor, The Godfather, On the Waterfront, Last Tango in Paris, Apocalypse Now
Montgomery Clift (1920–1966), 4-time Oscar-nominated actor, From Here to Eternity, The Misfits, Red River, Judgment at Nuremberg
James Coburn (1928–2002), Academy Award-winning actor, Our Man Flint, The Magnificent Seven, The Great Escape, Affliction
James M. Connor (born 1960), actor
Sandy Dennis (1937–1992), Academy Award-winning actress, Who's Afraid of Virginia Woolf?, Sweet November, The Out-of-Towners
Adam Devine (born 1983), actor and comedian
David Doyle (1929–1997), actor, Charlie's Angels
Mary Doyle (1931–1995), actress
Leslie Easterbrook (born 1949), actress, Police Academy films
Henry Fonda (1905–1982), Academy Award-winning actor, Mister Roberts, 12 Angry Men, The Grapes of Wrath, On Golden Pond
Hoot Gibson (1892–1962), actor and rodeo cowboy
Coleen Gray (1922–2015), actress, Kiss of Death, Red River
Leland Hayward (1902–1971), Hollywood and Broadway agent and producer
Jean Heather (1921–1995), actress, Double Indemnity
Hallee Hirsh (born 1987), actress, Flight 29 Down, JAG, ER
Virginia Huston (1925–1981), actress, Out of the Past
Bill Lee, overdub singer whose voice was used instead of Christopher Plummer's in the film version of The Sound of Music
Harold Lloyd (1893–1971), silent film actor and comedian
Danny Lockin (1943–1970), actor and dancer, Hello, Dolly!
Pierce Lyden (1908–1998), actor
Gordon MacRae (1921–1986), actor and singer, Oklahoma!, Carousel
Dorothy McGuire (1916–2001), Oscar-nominated actress, Gentleman's Agreement, Friendly Persuasion, Old Yeller

N–Z

Fred Niblo (1874–1948), actor, director, and producer
Nick Nolte (born 1941), Oscar-nominated actor and producer, 48 Hrs., The Prince of Tides, Cape Fear
Alexander Payne (born 1961), Oscar-nominated director and screenwriter, Nebraska, The Descendants, Sideways
Lenka Peterson (1925–2021), actress
Anne Ramsey (1929–1988), Oscar-nominated actress
Thurl Ravenscroft (1914–2005), voice actor and singer
Hilary Swank (born 1974), two-time Academy Award-winning actress, Boys Don't Cry, Million Dollar Baby (born in Lincoln)
Inga Swenson (born 1932), actress, Benson, Advise and Consent
Robert Taylor (1911–1969), actor, Ivanhoe, Quo Vadis, Camille
John Trudell (1946–2015), actor and documentary subject
Gabrielle Union (born 1973), actress, Bring It On, Bad Boys II (born in Omaha)
Red Wing (1884–1974), actress
Irene Worth (1916–2002), Tony Award-winning actress, Nicholas and Alexandra, Lost in Yonkers, Deathtrap
Darryl F. Zanuck (1902–1979), Hollywood studio mogul, producer and director

Comedians and humorists

James Adomian (born 1980), actor and stand-up comedian
Johnny Carson (1925–2005), comedian
Ryan Cownie, stand-up comedian
Adam DeVine (born 1983), actor, comedian, writer, Workaholics
Godfrey (born 1969), comedian and actor
Larry the Cable Guy (born 1963), comedian
Skip Stephenson (1940–1992), comedian and actor
Roger Welsch (born 1936), author, humorist, and folklorist
Bob Wiltfong (born 1969), comedian and actor, The Daily Show

Television and radio

Justin Bruening (born 1979), actor, All My Children, Knight Rider
Dick Cavett (born 1936), television talk show host
Abbie Cobb, actress, Suburgatory
Christopher B. Duncan (born 1964), actor, The Jamie Foxx Show, The District, Aliens in America
Jim Fitzpatrick (born 1959), actor, All My Children
Bryan Greenberg (born 1978), actor, musician, One Tree Hill, October Road, How to Make It in America 
Randy J. Goodwin (born 1967), actor and director, The Vampire Diaries, Girlfriends, Grey's Anatomy
Marg Helgenberger (born 1958), actress, CSI
Brad William Henke (born 1971), actor, October Road, Nikki, Lost
Vivi Janiss (1911–1988), theatre, film, and television actress
David Janssen (1931–1980), actor, The Fugitive
Floyd Kalber (1924–2004), television journalist and anchorman
Jay Karnes (born 1963), actor, Det. "Dutch" Wagenbach on The Shield
Emily Kinney (born 1985), actress, singer, The Walking Dead
Swoosie Kurtz (born 1944), actress, Sisters, Mike & Molly
Irish McCalla (1928–2002), actress, Sheena, Queen of the Jungle
Holt McCallany (born 1964), actor, Lights Out, Freedom, CSI: Miami
Scott Porter (born 1979), actor, Friday Night Lights, The Good Wife
Lindsey Shaw (born 1989), child actor for Ned's Declassified School Survival Guide (born in Lincoln)
Julie Sommars (born 1942), actress, Matlock
Rebecca Staab (born 1961), actress, former beauty queen, Live Shot
Janine Turner (born 1962), actress and author, Northern Exposure (born in Lincoln, raised in Texas)
Lucky Vanous (born 1961), model, actor, Pacific Palisades
Kim Winona (1930–1978), actress, Brave Eagle
David Yost (born 1969), actor and producer, Mighty Morphin Power Rangers
Paula Zahn (born 1956), television journalist

Music

Kianna Alarid (born 1978), lead singer for band Tilly and the Wall
Roni Benise, flamenco guitarist
Chip Davis (born 1947), singer-songwriter, founder of Mannheim Steamroller, and president and CEO of American Gramaphone
Ruth Etting (1896–1976), singer
Rick Evans, member of rock duo Zager and Evans, made famous by song "In the Year 2525" in 1969
Todd Fink (born 1974), member of the band The Faint
Jack Gilinsky (born 1996), musician, rap artist, 1 out of 2 in the rap duo Jack & Jack with best friend since kindergarten, Jack Johnson, their song, "Like That" went viral currently with over 24 million views on YouTube.
Howard Hanson (1896–1981), composer and conductor
Wynonie "Mr. Blues" Harris (1915–1969), rhythm and blues singer
Neal Hefti (1922–2008), jazz trumpeter and composer
 Amy Heidemann, member of the band Karmin, graduated from Seward High School in Seward, Nebraska
Nick Hexum, member of band 311
Neely Jenkins (born 1974), member of band Tilly and the Wall
Tim Kasher (born 1976), singer
Matty Lewis (born 1975), singer, guitarist
Randy Meisner (born 1946), singer-songwriter, bassist former member of the Eagles and Poco
Conor Oberst (born 1980), singer-songwriter with Bright Eyes
Bryan Olesen (born 1973), singer, guitarist of VOTA, former member of Newsboys
Jamie Pressnall (born 1976), member of band Tilly and the Wall
Paul Revere (born 1938), born in Harvard, Clay County; musician, teen idol, founder Paul Revere and the Raiders
Ann Ronell (1906/1908–1993), jazz composer and lyricist
Josh Rouse (born 1972), singer-songwriter 
Jason Shaw (born 1975), fiddle player
Elliott Smith (1969–2003), singer-songwriter
Ryland Steen (born 1980), Reel Big Fish drummer
Matthew Sweet (born 1964), rock musician
John Trudell (1946–2015), poet, performer, musician, leader AKA Graffiti Band
James Valentine (born 1978), Maroon 5 guitarist
Paul Williams (born 1940), singer-songwriter
Roger Williams (1924–2011), pianist
Denny Zager, member of rock duo Zager and Evans, made famous by song "In the Year 2525" in 1969

Other

David Phelps Abbott (1863–1934), magician and author
Lucas Cruikshank (born 1993), maker of internet videos
Ashley Graham (born 1987), model
Jaime King (born 1979), model and actress
Sono Osato (1919–2018), dancer
JoJo Siwa (born 2003), dancer and singer, Dance Moms
Sarah Rose Summers (born 1994), model and Miss USA 2018
Charles Weidman (1901–1975), dancer and choreographer

Art, literature, and journalism

Bess Streeter Aldrich (1881–1954), author of 200 short stories and 13 novels including Miss Bishop
Hartley Burr Alexander (1873–1939), writer, educator, scholar, philosopher, poet, and iconographer
Kurt Andersen (born 1954), co-founder of Spy Magazine
Gutzon Borglum (1867–1941), painter, sculptor, designer and engineer of the presidential busts on Mount Rushmore
Solon Borglum (1869–1922), sculptor, younger brother of Gutzon Borglum
Jennine Capó Crucet (born 1981), novelist, short story writer, essayist, professor, and cultural critic
Willa Cather (1873–1947), author
Raymond Chandler (1888–1959), detective fiction author, The Big Sleep (raised in Plattsmouth)
Earle D. Chesney (1900–1966), cartoonist
Mamie Claflin (1867-1929), newspaper editor and publisher
Ana Marie Cox (born 1972), founder and editor of the political blog Wonkette
Angel De Cora, painter, illustrator, American Indian advocate, Carlisle Boarding School teacher (1871–1919)
Loren Eiseley (1907–1977), anthropologist, science writer, ecologist, and poet (born in Lincoln)
John Philip Falter (1910–1982), artist known for many Saturday Evening Post covers
Ernest K. Gann (1910–1991), pioneer airline pilot, aviation writer, author of The High and the Mighty
Roxane Gay (born 1974), feminist writer, professor, editor and commentator
Terry Goodkind (1948–2020), best-selling fantasy author
Robert Henri (1865–1929), painter
M. Miriam Herrera, poet 
Clifton Hillegass (1918–2001), publisher and founder of CliffsNotes
L. Ron Hubbard (1911–1986), science fiction author and founder of Scientology
Lew Hunter (born 1935), screenwriter
Weldon Kees (1914–1955), poet, novelist, and short story writer
Ted Kooser (born 1939), former Poet Laureate Consultant in Poetry to the Library of Congress; former Poet Laureate of the United States; Pulitzer Prize winner
Stephen R. Lawhead (born 1950), best-selling author of fantasy and historical fiction
Christopher Lasch (1932–1994), historian, moralist, and social critic
Jefferson Machamer (1900–1960), illustrator
DeBarra Mayo (born 1953), writer and author
Wright Morris (1910–1998), novelist, photographer, and essayist
John Neihardt (1881–1973), poet, dubbed the "Poet Laureate of Nebraska and the Plains" by the Nebraska State Legislature in 1921
Tillie Olsen (1912–2007), author
Rose O'Neill (1874–1944), illustrator, writer, and creator of the Kewpie doll
Jean Potts (1910–1999), mystery writer
Daniel Quinn (1935–2018), author of the philosophical novel Ishmael and its sequels
Edward Ruscha (born 1937), artist
Brandon Sanderson (born 1975), best-selling science fiction and fantasy author
Mari Sandoz (1896–1966), novelist, biographer, lecturer, and teacher; author of Old Jules, Cheyenne Autumn, Slogum House
Joel Sartore, National Geographic photographer and founder of the Photo Ark
Dan Schlissel, record producer and label founder (Stand Up! Records, -ismist Recordings)
Nicholas Sparks (born 1965), author
Anna Louise Strong (1885–1970), journalist and author
John Trudell (1946–2015), author

Business

Howard F. Ahmanson Sr. (1906–1968), financier and philanthropist
Walter Behlen (1905–1994), founder of the Behlen Manufacturing Company in Columbus, Nebraska
Warren Buffett (born 1930), "Oracle of Omaha", investor; Forbes 2008 Richest Man in the World
Richard N. Cabela (1936–2014), entrepreneur, founder of Cabela's sporting goods store
Paul Endacott, Basketball Hall of Fame inductee (University of Kansas), president of Phillips Petroleum Company
Joyce Hall (1891–1982), founder of Hallmark Cards
Mary E. Smith Hayward (1842-1938), businesswoman; honorary president of the Nebraska Equal Suffrage Association
Andrew Higgins (1886–1952), industrialist and shipbuilder; owner and founder of Higgins Industries; manufacturer of "Higgins boats"
Peter Kiewit (1900–1979), contractor, investor, and philanthropist
C. Edward McVaney (1940–2020), founder of JD Edwards
William Norris (1911–2006), pioneering CEO of Control Data Corporation
Edwin Perkins (1889–1961), inventor of Kool-Aid; philanthropist
Frank Phillips (1873–1950), co-founder of Phillips Petroleum
Michael J. Saylor (born 1965), founder and CEO of MicroStrategy
Walter Scott Jr. (born 1931), civil engineer and philanthropist
Carl A. Swanson (1879–1949), founder of Swanson
Evan Williams (born 1972), creator of Blogger; CEO of Twitter
Zach Nelson (born 1961), CEO of NetSuite (2002-2016)

Science and medicine

Clayton Anderson (born 1959), NASA astronaut assigned to International Space Station Expedition 15
Nancy Coover Andreasen, neuroscientist and neuropsychiatrist
Barry Barish (born 1936), Nobel Prize in Physics 2017 for discovery of gravity waves 
Henry Beachell (1906–2006), developer of hybrid rice
George Wells Beadle (1903–1989), geneticist, 1958 Nobel Prize winner
Charles Edwin Bessey (1845–1915), botanist, responsible for planting of the Nebraska National Forest
Leon Douglass (1869–1940), inventor; co–founder of the Victor Talking Machine Company
John R. Dunning (1907–1975), physicist, played an instrumental role in the development of the atomic bomb
Harold "Doc" Edgerton (1903–1990), professor at MIT, pioneer in stroboscopic photography
Rollins A. Emerson (1873–1947), geneticist, pioneer in researching the genetics of maize
Val Fitch (1923–2015), nuclear physicist, 1980 Nobel Prize winner
Jay Wright Forrester (1918–2016), pioneer of computer engineering
Daniel Freeman (1826–1908), homesteader, physician and American Civil War veteran, first person to file for a claim under the Homestead Act of 1862
Edmund Jaeger (1887–1983), biologist
Jay Keasling (born 1964), synthetic biology pioneer
Francis La Flesche (1857–1932), first Native American anthropologist; author
Susan La Flesche Picotte (1865–1915), first person to receive federal aid for education; first American Indian woman to become a "western medicine" physician in the United States
Max Mathews (1926–2011), wrote first computer music program
Victor Mills (1897–1997), chemical engineer, inventor of the modern disposable diaper
Donald Othmer (1904–1995), chemical engineer
Joel Stebbins (1878–1966), astronomer
Ivan Sutherland (born 1938), inventor of the Sketchpad

Sportspeople
A–M

Grover Cleveland Alexander (1887–1950), Baseball Hall of Fame pitcher
Houston Alexander (born 1972), mixed martial artist
Barry Alvarez (born 1946), Wisconsin Badgers football coach and athletic director
Heather Armbrust (born 1977), IFBB professional bodybuilder
Richie Ashburn (1927–1997), Baseball Hall of Fame center fielder
Max Baer (1909–1959), former heavyweight boxing champion
George Baird (1907–2004), 1928 Olympic gold medalist in track and field
Brad Beckman (1964–1989), professional football player, 1988–1989
Wade Boggs (born 1958), professional baseball player, 1982–1999; 5x American League batting champion
Craig Bohl (born 1958), college football coach
Steve Borden "Sting" (born 1959), professional wrestler for CWA, UWF, NWA, WCW, WWA, TNA, and WWE
Bob Boozer (1937–2012), NBA All-Star (1968) and Olympian (Rome, 1960)
Buddy Carlyle (born 1977), professional baseball pitcher from Omaha who played for the MLB, KBO and NPB
Dan Carpenter (born 1985), placekicker for the Buffalo Bills
Bob Cerv (1926–2017), professional baseball player, 1951–1962
Joba Chamberlain (born 1985), professional baseball pitcher for the Detroit Tigers
Jeromey Clary (born 1983), offensive tackle for the San Diego Chargers
Sam Crawford (1880–1968), Baseball Hall of Fame, 2x Home run champion (1901, 1908), and 3x AL RBI champion (1910, 1914, 1915)
Gene Cronin (born 1933), lineman for 1957 NFL champion Detroit Lions
Eric Crouch (born 1978), football quarterback, 2001 Heisman Trophy winner
Brian Deegan (born 1975), motocross racer
Bob Devaney (1915–1997), football coach for the University of Nebraska Cornhuskers
Ted "The Million Dollar Man" DiBiase (born 1954), professional wrestler
Jake Diekman (born 1987), relief pitcher for the Arizona Diamondbacks
Brian Duensing (born 1983), relief pitcher for the Minnesota Twins
Jake Ellenberger (born 1985), UFC fighter
David Erb (1923–2019), jockey, winner of 1956 Kentucky Derby and Belmont Stakes
Chad Fleischer (born 1972), Alpine skier who competed in the 1994 and 1998 Winter Olympics
Rulon Gardner (born 1971), Olympic gold medalist in Greco-Roman wrestling
Bob Gibson (1935–2020), Baseball Hall of Fame pitcher for the St. Louis Cardinals
Johnny Goodman (1909–1970), last amateur golfer to win U.S. Open
Alex Gordon (born 1984), left fielder for the Kansas City Royals
Ahman Green (born 1977), football player for the Seattle Seahawks, Green Bay Packers, and Houston Texans
Ron Hansen (born 1938), professional baseball player for six MLB teams
Mel Harder (1909–2002), pitcher and manager for the Cleveland Indians
Alex Henery (born 1987), placekicker for the Philadelphia Eagles
Opal Hill (1892–1981), golfer and LPGA co-founder
Russ Hochstein (born 1977), guard for the Denver Broncos
Jeremy Horn (born 1975), mixed martial arts fighter in the Ultimate Fighting Championship
Chris Kelsay (born 1979), outside linebacker for the Buffalo Bills
Monte Kiffin (born 1940), football coach
Bill Kinnamon (1919–2011), MLB umpire
Sam Koch (born 1982), punter for Baltimore Ravens
Manny Lawson (born 1984), outside linebacker for the Buffalo Bills
Frank Leahy (1908–1973), football player, coach, and College Football Hall of Famer
Sean McDermott (born 1974), Head Coach for the Buffalo Bills
Zach Miller (born 1984), tight end for the Jacksonville Jaguars
Clarence Mitchell (1891–1963), professional baseball pitcher
Darrell Mudra (born 1929), college football coach

N–Z

Gregg Olson (born 1966), MLB pitcher, 1989 Rookie of the Year
Jed Ortmeyer (born 1978), professional hockey player for the Minnesota Wild
Tom Osborne (born 1937), former football coach for the University of Nebraska Cornhuskers
 Justin Patton (born 1997), basketball player for Hapoel Eilat of the Israeli Basketball Premier League, formerly in the NBA
Zach Potter (born 1986), tight end for the Jacksonville Jaguars
Ron Prince (born 1969), assistant offensive line coach for the Indianapolis Colts
James Raschke (born 1940), professional wrestler
Dave Rimington (born 1960), NFL offensive lineman, two-time Outland Trophy winner
Andy Roddick (born 1982), tennis star
Johnny Rodgers (born 1951), football running back, 1972 Heisman Trophy winner 
Gale Sayers (1943–2020), Football Hall of Fame running back for the Chicago Bears
Scott Shanle (born 1979), outside linebacker for the New Orleans Saints
Billy Southworth (1893–1969), manager of two World Series champion St. Louis Cardinals teams
George Stone (1876–1945), Major League Baseball left fielder; 1906 American League batting champion
Khyri Thomas (born 1996), basketball player for Maccabi Tel Aviv of the Israeli Basketball Premier League and the EuroLeague
Curtis Tomasevicz (born 1980), 2006 U.S. Olympic bobsledder and former Nebraska Cornhuskers football player
Jack Van Berg (1936–2017), Hall of Fame thoroughbred trainer
Brad Vering (born 1977), Olympic Greco-Roman wrestler in 2004 and 2008
"Gorgeous George" Wagner (1915–1963), professional wrestler
Dan Warthen (born 1952), former MLB pitcher and current pitching coach for the Texas Rangers
Danny Woodhead (born 1983), running back for the San Diego Chargers, attended Chadron State College
Jerry Zimmerman (1934–1998), MLB catcher for the Minnesota Twins
Greg Zuerlein (born 1987), placekicker for the St. Louis Rams

Fictional characters

"Clara Allen", who owns a ranch near Ogallala, in the miniseries Lonesome Dove, played by Anjelica Huston
"Ryan Bingham", the Omaha-based principal character from the film Up in the Air, played by George Clooney
"Tracy Flick" (Reese Witherspoon) and "Jim McAllister" (Matthew Broderick), student and teacher in Omaha suburb from Election
"Emma Greenway", a woman living in Kearney and hospitalized in Lincoln from the film Terms of Endearment, played by Debra Winger
"Whitey Marsh" (Mickey Rooney) and other characters in the Omaha-set 1938 film Boys Town, based on a true story
"Will McAvoy", anchor of the fictional Newsnight with Will McAvoy, HBO's The Newsroom. Portrayed by Jeff Daniels
"Penny" from The Big Bang Theory television sitcom, played by actress Kaley Cuoco
"Brock Samson", an OSI agent born in Omaha, on the Adult Swim show The Venture Bros.
"Warren Schmidt", an insurance agent from Omaha in the film About Schmidt, played by Jack Nicholson
"Kim Wexler", a lawyer in the television drama Better Call Saul, played by Rhea Seehorn
Members of the Strategic Air Command based in Omaha in the 1964 film Fail-Safe

Other

Edith Abbott (1876–1957), economist, social worker, educator, and author
Grace Abbott (1878–1939), social worker and child welfare reformer
Walter Brueggemann (born 1933), Protestant Old Testament scholar and theologian 
Frank W. Cyr (1900–1995), educator, author, and "Father of the Yellow School Bus"
K. G. William Dahl (1883–1917), Lutheran minister and founder of the Bethphage Inner Mission in Axtell
Clayton Danks (1879–1970), inspiration of the cowboy on the Wyoming trademark, Bucking Horse and Rider, with the gelding horse Steamboat; born in O'Neill in Holt County, Nebraska
William Eugene Galbraith (1926–2012), businessman and National Commander of The American Legion (1967–68)
Merle Elwin Hansen (1919–2009), farmer and conservationist
Carmelita Hinton (1890–1983), progressive educator
John L. Loos (1918–2011), historian of the Lewis and Clark Expedition
Malcolm X (1925–1965), civil rights leader
Roscoe Pound (1870–1964), botanist, lawyer, and law professor and theorist
Teresa Scanlan (born 1993), Miss America 2011
Charles Starkweather (1938–1959), spree killer who murdered 11 victims
Brandon Teena (1972–1993), a trans man whose murder was the basis of the movie Boys Don't Cry
Virginia Lamp Thomas (born 1957), consultant for The Heritage Foundation; wife of Supreme Court Justice Clarence Thomas
Robert B. Wilson (born 1937), economist 
Caroline M. Clark Woodward (1840-1924), temperance activist

See also

 Lists of Americans
 Who's Who in Nebraska

References

External links
"700 Famous Nebraskans"